The 60th Filmfare Awards South ceremony honouring the winners and nominees of the best of South Indian cinema in 2012 is an event that held on 20 July 2013 at the Hyderabad International Convention Center. The Black lady was unveiled by actress Tamannaah at a press meet held in Chennai, on 20 June 2013.
The awards were announced and distributed at Hyderabad on 20 July 2013. Sundeep Kishan and  Chinmayi Sripaada were the honorable anchors of the show with Chinamyi hosting the filmfare the second time.

Main awards
Winners are listed first, highlighted in boldface.

Kannada cinema

Malayalam cinema

Tamil cinema

Telugu cinema

Technical Awards

Special awards

References

General
 60th Idea Filmfare Awards 2013 (South) Kannada Nominations
 60th Idea Filmfare Awards 2013 (South) Malayalam Nominations
 60th Idea Filmfare Awards 2013 (South) Telugu Nominations
 60th Idea Filmfare Awards 2013 (South) Tamil Nominations

Specific

External links

 
 

Filmfare Awards South